Corporación Deportiva Santa Cecilia  is a Nicaraguan football team that used to play at the top level.

History
Based in Diriamba, Santa Cecilia was once one of the dominant powers in Nicaraguan football.  They won national titles in 1961, 1965, and then three straight from 1971-73.  The ensuing years have not been kind to Santa Cecilia, and they currently play in the third division.

Achievements
Primera División de Nicaragua: 5
1961, 1965 ,1971, 1972, 1973

List of Managers

 Salvador Dubois Leiva
 Jose Miguel Urtecho Gutiérrez
Salon de la fama de Nicaragua

References

Football clubs in Nicaragua